Euseius neococciniae is a species of mite in the family Phytoseiidae.

References

neococciniae
Articles created by Qbugbot
Animals described in 1978